Petronella Blaauboer van Balen-Blanken (married name Blauwboer or Blauwbos, 18 November 1917 — 29 October 2008) was a Dutch athlete, who competed in the high jump, long jump and hurdles in the late 1930s and 1940s. She was a member of athletics club  and represented the Netherlands at international competitions. Fanny Blankers-Koen was a member of the same club in the same period. She became the silver high jump medalist at the 1938 European Athletics Championships.

Career
One of her first main international achievement was in 1937, when Van Balen won the high jump event in an international competition against Germany.

Van Balen Blanken won the silver medal at the 1938 European Athletics Championships in the high jump event. In October 1938 she became the European record holder in the high jump, after the record was taken from record holder Dora Ratjen who turned out to be a male in a medical research. 

During her career Van Balen Blanken won many medals at the National Championships. She became national champion in 1938 ahead of Fanny Blankers-Koen. In 1940 she won silver medals in the long jump and high jump, both behind Blankers-Koen. At the 1943 national championships she became national champion in the high jump and 80 metres.

She continued competing after her marriage. Her last reported achievements, including competing still at international competitions, are from 1948.

Personal life
Van Balen Blanken was born on 18 November 1917 in Anna Paulowna. After the death of her husband Jacob Blaauboer, she died on 29 October 2008 in Schagen at the age of 90.

References

Other websites
Atletiek Vrouwen in Oranje 1928 – 1939 
newspaper image 

1917 births
2008 deaths
Sportspeople from North Holland
Dutch female athletes
Dutch female high jumpers
Dutch female long jumpers